Anguish ( or ) is an 1878 oil painting by August Friedrich Schenck. It depicts an anguished mother sheep standing over the dead body of its lamb, surrounded by a multitude of crows.

Perhaps Schenck's most famous painting, it is held by National Gallery of Victoria, in Melbourne, Australia since 1880. The painting was an early acquisition by the gallery, just a few years after it was founded, and has been voted the most popular of the gallery's 75,000 works on two occasions, in 1906 and 2011.

Description
The painting depicts a distraught ewe bleating in grief, her breath freezing in the cold air. The mother sheep is standing over the dead body of her lamb, a trickle of blood running from its mouth into the white snow, in a scene reminiscent of a pietà. The pair of sheep are encircled by a murder of black crows that crowd ominously around under a dull grey cloudy winter sky, waiting for an opportunity to scavenge the carcass. The painting's muted tones – almost monotone shades of white, grey, brown and black – reflect its despairing subject matter. It measures  and is signed "Schenck" in the lower left corner.

Tedd Got, a senior curator at the National Gallery of Victoria, has suggested that the work may have taken inspiration from the 1872 book The Expression of the Emotions in Man and Animals, in which Charles Darwin argued emotions have biological originals, and that animals have similar emotions to humans. It has also been interpreted as a commentary on the cruelty of society, represented by the crowd of opportunistic crows.

History
Schenck was born in Glückstadt in Holstein, now in Germany but then in Denmark, and lived and worked for most of his life in France. The painting was exhibited at the Paris Salon in 1878, under its French title Angoisses, and then in London the following year. The painting was bought by the London art dealer Agnew's and then sold to the National Gallery of Victoria. It arrived in Australia in 1880. It retains its original gilt frame.

Schenck reversed the scene in his c.1885 painting, L'Orphelin, souvenir d'Auvergne ("The Orphan, memory of Auvergne"), now held by the Musée d'Orsay, in which a lamb stands above the body of its dead mother, before a line of black crows waiting on a wooden fence.

References

External links
 Anguish by August Friedrich Albrecht SCHENCK, Leanne Cole
 Anguish (1878) by August Schenck, Amuze Art Lectures

1878 paintings
Paintings in the collection of the National Gallery of Victoria
Sheep in art